Nictaux Falls is a community in the Canadian province of Nova Scotia, located in Annapolis County on Nova Scotia Route 10, immediately south of Nictaux.

References

Communities in Annapolis County, Nova Scotia